Your Universe is the debut album by former Rivermaya frontman, Rico Blanco, released in 2008. A vinyl version of the album were released on July 28, 2019.

Overview
After Annoncing his departure on Rivermaya, Rico went on a year-long leave from the local music scene and toured the US and Europe. On June 12, 2008 he returns to the music scene and release hiis debut single "Yugto". and an album is in the works to be released next month.

Track listing

Personnel
 Rico Blanco - Guitars, Bass, Drums, Piano, Synths, Programming
 Nathan Azarcon - Bass on "Your Universe"
 Buddy Zabala - Bass on "Say Forever"
 Cynthia Alexander - Bass on "Yugto"
 Louie Talan - Bass on "Yugto"
 Rommel dela Cruz - Bass on "Ayuz" and "Yugto"
 Nick Azarcon - Jam Guitars on "Ayuz"
 Junjun Regalado - Drums
 Otep Concepcion - Drums on "Yugto"
 Boyet Aquino - Drums on "Yugto"
 Wendell Garcia - Drums on "Your Universe"
 Paolo Santiago - Drums on "Say Forever"
 Archie Lacorte - Sax on "Say Forever"
 Jack Rufo - Co-arranged the song "Start Again"
 Strings: Denise Huang, Rachelle Alcances, Ma. Christina & Ed Pasamba on "Your Universe"
 String Arrangement by: Arnold Buena on "Your Universe"
 Special Thanks to: Alan Feliciano on "Your Universe"
 Choir Vox: Rico Blanco; Choir: Rico Blanco, Mark Villena, Frey Zambrano, Paolo Santiago on "Yugto"
 Horns: Archie Lacorte, Precious dela Cruz, Gilbert Francisco, Lowel Lalic of Brass Monkeys on "Ayuz"
 Strings: Denise Huang, Rechelle Alcances, Ma. Cristina & Ed Pasamba on "Yugto"
 Horn Section: Wowie Ansano & Fards Tupas of Radioactive Sago Project on "Yugto"
 Strings Arranged by: Rico Blanco Notated and Conducted by: Arnold Buena on "Yugto"

References

External links
http://www.titikpilipino.com/album/?albumid=2058

2008 debut albums
Rico Blanco albums